Xinhua Subdistrict is a subdistrict in Tongzhou District, Beijing. It borders Yongshun Town in the north and west, Tongyun Subdistrict in the east, Zhongcang Subdistrict in the south, and Beiyuan Subdistrict in the southwest. The area of jurisdiction is 4.45 square kilometers, with 37,286 residents as of 2020.

The name Xinhua corresponds to Xinhua Avenue that runs through the subdistrict.

History 
In 1948, four townships of former Tongxian were merged to create Tongzhou City. The city was changed to a town in 1950. In 1997, Tongzhou Town was disbanded, with Beicheng and Xinjian Subdistricts merged to form Xinhua Subdistrict.

Administrative division 
Xinhua Subdistrict has jurisdiction over the following areas:

Gallery

References 

Tongzhou District, Beijing
Subdistricts of Beijing